Albury Technical College is a heritage-listed tertiary college at 502 Dean Street, Albury, City of Albury, New South Wales, Australia. It is also known as Albury TAFE Annex. The property is owned by Charles Sturt University. It was added to the New South Wales State Heritage Register on 2 April 1999.

History

Description

Heritage listing 
Albury Technical College was listed on the New South Wales State Heritage Register on 2 April 1999.

See also

References

Attribution 

New South Wales State Heritage Register
Education in Albury, New South Wales
Universities in New South Wales
Articles incorporating text from the New South Wales State Heritage Register